Zheleznyakov was one of eight Fidonisy-class destroyers built for the Imperial Russian Navy during World War I. She was originally named Korfu before she was renamed Petrovsky in 1925 and Zheleznyakov in 1939.

Design and description 

Her crew numbered 136.

The Fidonisy-class ships mounted a main armament of four single 102 mm Pattern 1911 Obukhov guns, one on the forecastle and three aft; one of these latter guns was superfiring over the other two. Anti-aircraft defense for Korfu and her sisters that were completed after the war was provided by a single  Lender gun on the stern, a  Maxim cannon, and four  M-1 machine guns. The destroyers mounted four triple  torpedo tube mounts amidships with two reload torpedoes and could carry 80 M1908 naval mines. They were also fitted with a Barr and Stroud rangefinder and two  searchlights.

References

Bibliography

Further reading

External links

Fidonisy-class destroyers
Ships built at the Black Sea Shipyard
1917 ships
Cold War destroyers of the Soviet Union